Anouk Ferjac (born 25 May 1932) is a French actress. She has appeared in 100 films and television shows between 1946 and 2000.

Selected filmography

 Scandal on the Champs-Élysées (1949)
 Justice Is Done (1950)
 Without Trumpet or Drum (1950)
 Adam Is Eve (1954)
 La Traversée de Paris (1956)
 Live for Life (1967)
 Je t'aime, je t'aime (1968)
 This Man Must Die (1969)
 Le Drakkar (1973)
 Piaf (1974)
 The Garden That Tilts (1974)
 Docteur Françoise Gailland (1976)
 Little Marcel (1976)
 Peppermint Soda (1977)
 Liberty Belle (1983)
 Lien de parenté (1986)
 Merci la vie (1991)

References

External links

1932 births
Living people
French film actresses
Actresses from Paris
French television actresses
20th-century French actresses